Mats André Kaland (born 9 May 1989) is a Norwegian footballer who currently plays for Strømmen IF.

Club career

Kaland was born in Bergen. He made his debut for Løv-Ham on 5 April 2010 in the 2–1 victory over Sarpsborg 08.

Before the 2012 season he signed a contract with Hønefoss. He got his debut in a 0–0 draw against Lillestrøm on 24 March 2012. He scored his first goal for Hønefoss against Vålerenga on 19 May 2012; the only goal in the match.

After 2014 season he left the Hønefoss, he later signed with Swedish side Varbergs BoIS for one year. January 2016 he signed a two-year contract with Fredrikstad FK. In Fredrikstad he struggled to get playing time, and he returned to Varbergs on loan for the remainder of the 2016-season.

In July 2017 he signed a contract with Ullensaker/Kisa He left the club at the end of 2018.

Career statistics

References

External links

1989 births
Living people
Footballers from Bergen
Norwegian footballers
Association football midfielders
Løv-Ham Fotball players
Hønefoss BK players
Fredrikstad FK players
Varbergs BoIS players
Ullensaker/Kisa IL players
Strømmen IF players
Norwegian First Division players
Superettan players
Eliteserien players
Norwegian expatriate footballers
Expatriate footballers in Sweden
Norwegian expatriate sportspeople in Sweden